Vanchi Jefferson may refer to:

 Shawn Jefferson, American football wide receivers coach for the Arizona Cardinals and former wide receiver
 Van Jefferson, American football wide receiver for the Los Angeles Rams